The Music from Matthew Barney's Drawing Restraint 9 is the second soundtrack album by Björk, released on 25 July 2005 in the UK and on 23 August 2005 in the US. It was composed for Matthew Barney for his film of the same title.

The album was re-released in 2006 as a DualDisc including new DTS 96/24 5.1-channel surround sound mixes on the DVD-audio side, plus the extra track "Petrolatum". The DualDisc also formed part of the Surrounded box set.

Background
For the composing of the soundtrack, Björk traveled to Japan to study ancient Japanese music. Several tracks are made with the sound of the shō, a Japanese instrument which contains 16 various reeds; Mayumi Miyata plays the shō on multiple compositions in the soundtrack and appears in the film playing the instrument. "Holographic Entrypoint" features a Noh score and vocal performance by Shiro Nomura, which complements a climactic scene in the film.

Alternative folk singer Will Oldham (also known as Bonnie 'Prince' Billy) is featured on the first track, "Gratitude", singing a letter from a Japanese fisherman to General Douglas MacArthur set to a melody by Matthew Barney. Björk brought "Nameless" back from her 2003 tour, and, with the help of Leila Arab, looped and edited it to create the track "Storm". Björk's vocals feature only on the tracks "Bath", "Storm", and "Cetacea". "Gratitude", "Shimenawa" and "Cetacea" feature harp player Zeena Parkins, who previously collaborated with Björk on her 2001 album Vespertine. "Hunter Vessel" was later sampled on her album Volta for the tracks "Vertebræ by Vertebræ" and "Declare Independence". The track "Storm" was featured in the 2012 video game Spec Ops: The Line.

Track listing

The film
The following is a list of the full score used in the film ordered from when they chronologically appear. Many of the tracks are instrumental or variations of the main themes so were not included on the official soundtrack.

 "Gratitude"  – 4:59
 "Petrolatum" – 6:10
 "Haf"
 "Pearl" – 3:43
 "Nisshin Maru"  – 2:41
 "Host"  – 5:50
 "Bath"  – 5:07
 "Aposiopesis"  – 5:16
 "Hunter Vessel" – 6:36
 "Shimenawa" – 2:48
 "Vessel Shimenawa" – 1:54
 "Repose" ;- 8:49
 "Storm"  – 5:32
 "Holographic Entrypoint"  – 9:57
 "Ambergris March" – 3:57
 "Field Inversion";- 1:00
 "Cetacea"  – 3:12
 "Antarctic Return" – 4:18

Personnel

Björk – arranger, producer, programmer, keyboards, harp, beat programming
Tanya Tagaq – throat singing
Luis "Kako" Alvarez – design assistant
Yuji Arai – coordination, session coordinator
Matthew Barney – director, producer, writer, design, direction, filmmaker
Scott Bartucca – oboe
Mark Bell – producer, beat programming
David Bobroff – contrabass trombone
James Button – oboe
Bruce Eidem – trombone
Emil Friðfinnsson – horn
Christopher Gaudi – oboe
Barbara Gladstone – producer
Kathy Halvorson – oboe
Shinichi Ishikawa – liner notes
Clarice Jensen – assistant, project coordinator
Mai Kamio – chorus
Alisa Kikuchi – chorus
Alexandra Knoll – oboe
Winnie Lai – oboe
Dan "D Unit" Levine – trombone
Dan Levine – trombone
Eleanor Miceli – chorus
Taro Miceli – chorus
Mayumi Miyata – sho
Umeda Miyuki – assistant engineer
Tony Morgan – design
Nico Muhly – conductor, keyboards, preparation, score preparation
Shiro Nomura – vocals
Shonosuke Okura – percussion, chant
Will Oldham – vocals
Guðrún Óskarsdóttir – harpsichord
Eiríkur Örn Pálsson – trumpet
Zeena Parkins – harp
Dean Plank – trombone
Sigurður S. Porbergsson – trombone
Sturla Pórisson – assistant engineer
Akira Rabelais – piano treatments
Matt Ryle – production design
Einar St. Jónsson – trumpet
Christopher Seguine – post production supervisor, post producer
Jónas Sen – celeste
Shogo Senda – chorus
Raku Shigematsu – chorus
Valgeir Sigurðsson – keyboards, programming, producer, engineer, mixing, beat programming
Samuel Solomon – percussion, glockenspiel, crotale
Peter Strietmann – photography, photography director
Henry Takizawa – chorus
Merrill Takizawa – chorus
Takahiro Uchida – engineer
Kuniyoshi Ueda – noh arranger, translation
Marcus Grandon – assistance to Mr. Ueda
Paul P Dub Walton – mixing
Chris Washburn – trombone
Tommy Webster – assistant engineer
Chris Winget – photography

Charts

References

External links
 Drawing Restraint 9 mini-website
 Drawing Restraint 9 lyrics on official website
 
 

Björk albums
Film soundtracks
Albums produced by Mark Bell (British musician)
2005 soundtrack albums
One Little Independent Records soundtracks
Albums produced by Björk